The 2005 Terek Grozny season was the first season that the club played in the Russian Premier League, the highest tier of association football in Russia. They finished the season bottom of the league, 16th, on 14 points after receiving a six-point deduction for failing to pay a transfer fee in time.

Season review

Squad

Transfers

In

Out

Released

Trial

Competitions

Super Cup

Premier League

Results by round

Results

League table

Russian Cup

2005–06

Round of 16 took place during the 2006 season.

Squad statistics

Appearances and goals

|-
|colspan="14"|Players away from the club on loan:
|-
|colspan="14"|Players who appeared for Terek Grozny but left during the season:

|}

Goal scorers

Clean sheets

Disciplinary record

References

FC Akhmat Grozny seasons
Akhmat Grozny